Alberto Cairo (born 1952, in Ceva, Italy) is an Italian physiotherapist and humanitarian known for his work treating Afghan amputees. He directs the seven centres for orthopedics run by the International Committee of the Red Cross in Afghanistan.

Early life and education
Alberto Cairo was born in Ceva, Italy on May 17 1952. He grew up in Turin, Italy. Cairo first worked as a lawyer in Italy.

Career
From 1987 to 1990, Cairo worked for an Italian NGO in Sudan.

In 1990, Cairo joined the International Committee of the Red Cross and was assigned to Kabul, Afghanistan to develop their  programs in physical rehabilitation. Since then, Cairo has worked continuously for the Red Cross, and is now the director of its seven Afghan orthopedic centres. As of 2017 he is credited with helping over 100,000 Afghan victims of landmines and accidents to walk again through the use of prosthetics.

Awards
In 2010, Cairo was nominated for a Nobel Peace Prize. In 2013, he received the Henry Dunant Medal, the highest award of the Red Cross Movement. He was awarded Honorary citizenship of Afghanistan on 4 August 2019.

He won the Nansen Refugee Award in 2019.

References

1952 births
Living people
Italian physiotherapists
International Red Cross and Red Crescent Movement
Italian humanitarians
People in health professions from Turin
20th-century Italian lawyers
People from Ceva
Italian expatriates in Sudan
Italian expatriates in Afghanistan